The Physics Abstraction Layer (PAL) is an open-source cross-platform physical simulation API abstraction system. It is similar to a physics engine wrapper, however it is far more flexible providing extended abilities. PAL is free software, released under the BSD license.

PAL is a high-level interface for low-level physics engines used in games, simulation systems, and other 3D applications. It supports a number of dynamic simulation methodologies, including rigid body, liquids, soft body, ragdoll, and vehicle dynamics. PAL features a simple C++ API and intuitive objects (e.g. Solids, Joints, Actuators, Sensors, and Materials). It also features COLLADA, Scythe Physics Editor, and XML-based file storage.

The Physics Abstraction Layer provides a number of benefits over directly using a physics engine:
 Flexibility – It allows developers to switch between different physics engines to see which engine provides their needs, as well as quickly testing a new engine.
 Portable – Developers are able to use the physics engine which provides the best performance for different platforms, and are able to write platform independent code.
 Security – If a middleware provider is acquired by another company or development is discontinued, developers can switch engines.
 Scalable – The abstraction layer allows developers to run their code on handheld console platforms up to supercomputers.
 Ease of use – Implementation details of the physics engine are abstracted, providing a cleaner interface to the developer.
 Benchmarking – Researchers can directly compare the performance of various dynamic simulations systems.

PAL is designed with a pluggable abstract factory allowing code to be written and compiled once and allowing runtime selection of different physics engines, as well as feature upgrades.

Supported engines
PAL supports multiple physics engines, including:
 Box2D
 Bullet
 Newton Game Dynamics
 Open Dynamics Engine
 PhysX (formerly NovodeX and incorporating Meqon)
 Tokamak physics engine

Supported file formats
PAL supports multiple file formats, including:
 COLLADA
 Scythe Physics Editor file format
 XML

Benchmark
The PAL project provides a set of standard benchmarks allowing developers to directly compare the physics engines and select the engine that provides the best solution in terms of computational efficiency and physical accuracy. Care should be taken when deciding on which engine to actually use though, since engines may be tweaked in ways which PAL doesn't support.

References

External links
 
 Interactive PAL benchmark

Computer physics engines